Jamelle Cornley (born April 18, 1987) is an American professional basketball player for Club Malvín of the Liga Uruguaya de Básquetbol in Uruguay. He played collegiately at Penn State.

Playing career
He played as an import for the Rain or Shine Elasto Painters in the Philippine Basketball Association during the 2012 PBA Governors' Cup. During his tenure in the Philippines, he was awarded as the Bobby Parks PBA Best Import of the Conference for his contribution to the Elasto Painters. He helped the Painters to capture its first championship (2012 Governor's Cup).

In December 2017, Cornley signed with Atlético Echagüe, a club based in Argentina. In October 2018, he signed with his actual club, Club Malvín, based in Uruguay.

References

External links
French League Profile 
Player Profile at PBA-Online!
Penn State Nittany Lions bio

Living people
1987 births
American expatriate basketball people in France
American expatriate basketball people in Mexico
American expatriate basketball people in the Philippines
American expatriate basketball people in South Korea
Caballeros de Culiacán players
Fort Wayne Mad Ants players
Daegu KOGAS Pegasus players
JL Bourg-en-Bresse players
Penn State Nittany Lions basketball players
People from Normal, Illinois
Philippine Basketball Association imports
Shooting guards
Small forwards
Basketball players from Illinois
American men's basketball players